Horizon High School is a public high school in Winter Garden, Florida. Horizon High is within the jurisdiction of Orange County Public Schools. The school opened at beginning of the 2021–22 school year to relieve overcrowding at Windermere High School.

History 
Completed in 2021 at a cost of 111.2 Million dollars, Horizon High was formed to relief Windermere High School.

For the late bell, the school uses the Madagascar version of “I Like to Move It” for a minute before the “three, two, one” in the song is followed by the Taco Bell bell bong to signal the start of classes.

Project information 
The building completion date was July 2021, and the project completion date was October 2021. Horizon High School opened to students in August 2021. The Student capacity is 2685. The Gross floor area is 372,492, and the zite area is 69.8 acres. The high school resides in district 4. The architect was SchenkelShultz, Contractor was Wharton-Smith, Project manager was Cass Hurst. The project description includes: 
Administration Office
Kitchen
Cafeteria
Media Center
EHPA Gym
Art and Music Labs
Science Labs
Computer Lab(s)
Multipurpose Lab(s)
Classrooms
Hard Courts
Baseball Field
Softball Field
Track and Field
Football Field
Practice Field(s)
Covered Walkways
Expanded Parking Lot
Enhanced classroom technology including new
computers and interactive touch-screen panels
Secure campus with one public entrance

Administration 
The principal of Horizon High School is now Andrew Jackson. Before being appointed principal, Jackson was the principal of Bridgewater Middle School.  The principal at opening was Laura Beusse. Before being appointed principal, Beusse was the principal of Ocoee High School.

Academics 
Horizon High School will have Business/Accounting, Digital Media Design, Agriscience/Animal Sciences, Culinary Arts, Digital Video Technology, Band, Orchestra, Keyboarding, Guitar, Jazz Ensemble, Chorus, Eurythmics, Dance, Weights, Drawing, Ceramics, Theatre, Technical Theatre, Musical Theatre, Journalism (Yearbook), Debate, Student Government Association (SGA Leadership), National Defense Cadet Corp (NDCC), Project Lead the Way (PLTW) Biomedical, and Engineering programs at the school. Horizon will also teach several AP Courses and teach ASL, Spanish, and French as foreign language classes.

Theatre Department 
Horizon High School is home to an award-winning theatre department led by Nicholas Wainwright. In its inaugural year, they've inducted over 40 thespians to International Thespian Society. Producing two major productions that year including an original adaptation of A Christmas Carol by Nicholas Wainwright, and Meagan Spry - with an original score by Maura Sitzmann.  The department then debuted The SpongeBob Musical as their first spring musical production, nominated for 28 Applause Awards, winning one for Best Ensemble. The program is known for ensemble-based storytelling and bringing in guest artists from nearby theme parks and theatre including Walt Disney World and Universal Orlando Resort.

Their second season, themed around "family healing" will include 3 musical productions: the USA premiere of The Grinning Man, a one-act production of The Old Man and the Old Moon, and the Orlando-area premiere of the musical Anastasia.

A cast-album, featuring a professional cast and selected student from the original production of A CHRISTMAS CAROL is now on Spotify, Apple Music, and other streaming platforms.

References 

Winter Garden, Florida
Orange County Public Schools
2021 establishments in Florida
Educational institutions established in 2021
High schools in Orange County, Florida